Ronald James Chipperfield (born March 28, 1954) is a Canadian former professional ice hockey player who served as the Edmonton Oilers' first National Hockey League (NHL) captain. He played for the Oilers in both the World Hockey Association (WHA) and the NHL, as well as the Vancouver Blazers and the Calgary Cowboys of the WHA, and the Quebec Nordiques of the NHL. Chipperfield was born in Brandon, Manitoba.

Playing career
Chipperfield started his junior career in 1969–70 with the Dauphin Kings of the Manitoba Junior Hockey League (MJHL), leading the league in scoring. The Kings won the MJHL championship and advanced to the 1970 Memorial Cup western semi-final before bowing out. Next he spent four years with Brandon Wheat Kings of the Western Canadian Hockey League (WCHL), where he set numerous team and league records. His most successful year there was his last, 1973–74, when he scored 90 goals, setting a league record at the time, won the scoring title, and was named league MVP.

Chipperfield was drafted in 1974 by the California Golden Seals in the first round, 17th overall, of the 1974 NHL amateur draft, and in the second round, 20th overall of the 1974 WHA Amateur Draft by the Vancouver Blazers. He joined the Blazers, spending a year with the team before it moved to Calgary and became the Calgary Cowboys. Chipperfield played two seasons for the Cowboys, then a three-year run with the Edmonton Oilers. In his third season with the team, the Oilers joined the National Hockey League. Chipperfield made his NHL debut in 1979 and went on to score 22 goals and 45 points that season. In March of that season the Oilers traded him to the Quebec Nordiques for goaltender Ron Low, a former teammate in Dauphin. Chipperfield played just four games with the Nordiques the following year, and then took his skills to the top league in Italy in 1981. That season he scored a league-leading 78 goals and 128 points in just 39 games. His final three seasons were spent there, playing for HC Bolzano.

Awards and achievements
 MJHL Co-Goal Scoring Leader (1970)
 Turnbull Cup MJHL Champions (1970)
 WCHL All-Star Team (1974)
 WCHL Scoring Champion (1974)
 WCHL MVP (1974)
 Honoured Member of the Manitoba Hockey Hall of Fame

Career statistics

References

External links
 Profile at hockeydraftcentral.com
 
 Ron Chipperfield's biography at Manitoba Hockey Hall of Fame
 

1954 births
Living people
Bolzano HC players
Brandon Wheat Kings players
Calgary Cowboys players
California Golden Seals draft picks
Canadian ice hockey centres
Dauphin Kings players
Edmonton Oilers players
Edmonton Oilers (WHA) players
Ice hockey people from Manitoba
National Hockey League first-round draft picks
Sportspeople from Brandon, Manitoba
Quebec Nordiques players
Rochester Americans players
Vancouver Blazers draft picks
Vancouver Blazers players
Canadian expatriate ice hockey players in Italy